The Party for Socialism and Liberation (PSL) is a communist party in the United States established in 2004. Its members are active in a wide range of movements including the labor, anti-war, immigrants' rights, women's rights, and anti-police brutality movements. It has been closely tied to the ANSWER Coalition throughout its existence; PSL founder Brian Becker is ANSWER's National Coordinator. Other prominent members include Gloria La Riva, Michael Prysner, and Eugene Puryear.

History 

The PSL, which initially had around 40 members, was formed when the San Francisco branch and other members left the Workers World Party in June 2004, announcing that "the Workers World Party leadership is no longer capable of fulfilling [the] mission" of building socialism. Its co-founders included Richard Becker and Gloria La Riva. During that time, it has operated out of a small storefront in San Francisco's Mission District. By 2019, it said it had members in 90 cities. 

The PSL ran La Riva and Sunil Freeman in the 2020 United States presidential election. Originally Leonard Peltier was the vice-presidential nominee, but he withdrew for health reasons.

Arrest of Denver PSL organizers 
Following a series of protests in the summer of 2020 against the death of Elijah McClain, the Aurora Police Department arrested four protest organizers, including two members of the Socialism and Liberation, on charges ranging from inciting a riot to kidnapping. The kidnapping charges related to a protest on July 3 where the Aurora police precinct was surrounded by protesters calling for the officers responsible for McClain's death to be fired and charged. On September 17, three party members, Joel Northam, Lillian House, Eliza Lucero, and another community activist, Terrance Roberts, were arrested. House, Lucero, and Northam faced up to 48 years in prison.
The activists argued that their arrests were an act of retaliation and intimidation by the police.

After their appearance in court on March 26, 2021, an Adams county judge dropped the kidnapping charges, but the organizers were still being pursued for numerous other felonies and misdemeanors for over five more months. It wasn't until September 13, 2021 that all charges were finally dropped.

Ideology 
The party's goal is to lead a revolution paving the way towards socialism, under which a "new government of working people" would be formed. The PSL proposes many radical changes to be implemented by this government. In the political sphere, all elected representatives should be recallable, securing freedom of speech for the working class and the elimination of corporate influence through lobbying from politics. The party's program states: "Achieving fully developed socialism, a goal that has not yet been achieved anywhere, will open the way to communism and the end of class society."

Anti-capitalism

The PSL describes its primary goal as the revolutionary overthrow of capitalism and the institution of socialism, stating:
The Party for Socialism and Liberation believes that the only solution to the deepening crisis of capitalism is the socialist transformation of society. Driven by an insatiable appetite for ever greater profits regardless of social cost, capitalism is on a collision course with the people of the world and the planet itself. Imperialist war; deepening unemployment and poverty; deteriorating health care, housing and education; racism; discrimination and violence based on gender and sexual orientation; environmental destruction—all are inevitable products of the capitalist system itself.

The idea that the capitalists’ grip on society and their increasingly repressive state can be abolished through any means other than a revolutionary overturn is an illusion...There are really only two choices for humanity today—an increasingly destructive capitalism, or socialism.

Economics
The PSL would, among other measures, prohibit the exploitation of labor for private profit, implement a working week of 30 hours, introduce a basic income guarantee, ensure paid parental and family leave for up to two years, provide paid sick and disability leave, require a minimum of one month's paid vacation, institute single payer health insurance, outlaw renting and selling land, provide free college, and eliminate fossil fuels and nuclear energy.

Decolonization
The PSL would grant the right of self-determination to what it considers oppressed nations of the United States, including "African Americans, Native, Puerto Rican and other Latino national minorities, the Hawaiian nation, Asian, Pacific Islander, Arab, and other oppressed peoples who have experienced oppression as a whole people under capitalism". It would grant independence to Puerto Rico, American Samoa, Guam, the Virgin Islands and the Mariana Islands, which it considers colonies.

Foreign policy
It has been outspoken in condemning Israel and its role in the Middle East. The PSL led demonstrations against the Israeli invasion of Lebanon in July 2006 and supports the right of return for Palestinians. The PSL voiced solidarity with Nepal upon the overthrow of the monarchy and the election of Pushpa Kamal Dahal in 2008.

The PSL generally views other self-described socialist countries favorably. It supports Cuba and mourned the death of its former President Fidel Castro; additionally, it has endorsed activities that called for the release of the Cuban Fivedeemed political prisoners by supportersand called for the extradition of anti-Castro terrorist Luis Posada Carriles from the United States. It supports the Bolivarian Revolution in Venezuela. Historically, it has described the Soviet Union positively, saying that the October Revolution was "the single biggest event that shaped global politics in the 20th century". However, it believes that the New Economic Policy of Vladimir Lenin "led to a re-polarization of social classes, especially in the countryside". The PSL blames the reforms initiated by Mikhail Gorbachev for the dissolution of the Soviet Union.

While the PSL has at times been critical of the Chinese government, particularly for failing to uphold certain communist ideals like the abolition of private property, it views the Chinese Revolution favorably, argues that the Communist Party of China has made important contributions to socialism and anti-imperialism, and argues that, despite its flaws, a "militant political defense of the Chinese government" is necessary to stave off "counterrevolution, imperialist intervention and dismemberment". The PSL has generally defended China's human rights records, denying, for instance, the premise that the Chinese military massacred student protestors in the 1989 Tiananmen Square protests and that China maintains a system of internment camps in Xinjiang. The PSL supports China's policies towards Tibet and opposed the 2019–20 Hong Kong protests, calling them "chauvinist", "separatist", and "anti-China".

The stance of the PSL on North Korea is that the country is often unfairly targeted and that the goal of the United States is regime change. The PSL advocates a significant overhaul of US foreign policy towards North Korea, including the lifting of sanctions on North Korea, the withdrawal of US troops from South Korea, and the signing of a peace treaty. The PSL is supportive of North Korea's nuclear weapons program; in the PSL's official newspaper, for instance, Stephan Gowans argued that a North Korean nuclear arsenal is "to be welcomed by anyone who opposes imperialist military interventions; supports the right of a people to organize its affairs free from foreign domination; and has an interest in the survival of one of the few top-to-bottom, actually-existing, alternatives to the global capitalist system of oppression, exploitation and foreign domination". PSL has also expressed skepticism towards Western claims of North Korea's human rights record, arguing that "conditions in North Korea are vastly better than those in other developing countries" and stating that condemnations of North Korea's human rights records are "thinly veiled justification[s] for U.S. aggression toward North Korea".

The PSL opposes the American-led intervention in the Syrian Civil War, arguing that the United States' goal is "the projection of permanent imperial power and domination in a region that contains two-thirds of the world's oil reserves". It has generally been supportive of Syrian President Bashar al-Assad and Russian military efforts in Syria, and denies the conclusion of the Organisation for the Prohibition of Chemical Weapons (OPCW) and other international organizations that the Syrian government used chemical weapons, which are banned under the Chemical Weapons Convention.

The PSL has been critical of certain intergovernmental organizations, particularly international economic institutions like the World Trade Organization, International Monetary Fund, and World Bank. Its official newspaper published an article stating that the "WTO is one of many institutions, like the G8, the International Monetary Fund and the World Bank, that undermine the sovereignty of nations by forcing the implementation of disastrous neoliberal economic policies of privatization, liberalization and deregulation". It has further argued that "the IMF works on behalf of multinational corporations, finding natural resources, sweatshop laborers, and consumers for Western capitalism's surplus production" and has called the G20 an "instrument of capitalist plunder". It has also called the International Criminal Court a "fake court that has been used as a tool by the imperialists against those resisting imperialist aggression".

Anti-war
The PSL co-operates with other organizations across the United States in the anti-war movement and is a member of the steering committee of the Act Now to Stop War and End Racism Coalition (A.N.S.W.E.R.). As one of the most active members of the coalition, the PSL has gained notice for successfully forging ties with Arab and Muslim American groups such as the Muslim American Society, Al-Awda and the American-Arab Anti-Discrimination Committee. The PSL has advocated for the end of the United States military presence in Iraq, Syria, and Afghanistan, and the closure of all United States foreign military bases.

Criminal justice

The PSL advocates "the overthrow, dismantling and complete replacement" of the "police, prisons, military and courts" of the United States. It supports replacing the current legal system of the United States with a "new justice system based on the democratic organization of the working class and its right to defend its class interests on the basis of solidarity and unity" and advocates reorganizing the prison system around "social education and rehabilitation".

Publications 
The party's main publication is the website and monthly paper Liberation News, which replaced a quarterly magazine, Socialism and Liberation. The PSL also publishes Breaking the Chains: A Socialist Perspective on Women's Liberation, a quarterly socialist and feminist magazine, and Reds In Ed, a monthly newsletter initiated by teachers who are members of the PSL. Additionally, the PSL publishes Liberation School, which publishes longer-form analysis, Party documents, interviews, and educational resources including study guides, curricula, and video and audio courses.

The PSL outlines its political perspective, including its assessment of the current international and domestic situation, in the pamphlet Who We Are, What We Stand For. The party also owns its own printing company, PSL Publications, through which it has published multiple printed books such as Socialists and War: Two Opposing Trends by members Mazda Majidi and Brian Becker and an e-book which was released through Amazon titled A Woman's Place Is in the Struggle by members Ana Maria Ramirez, Anne Gamboni, Gloria La Riva and Liz Lowengard. The PSL's publication company, Liberation Media, is headquartered in San Francisco, California.

Election results

Presidential elections

Notable members 

 Eugene Puryear, reporter and candidate for vice president in 2008 and 2016
 Gloria La Riva, political activist and perennial candidate
 Jodi Dean, academic
 Michael Prysner, anti-war activist
 Kristin Richardson Jordan (formerly), poet, activist and member of the New York City Council (9th district)
 Peta Lindsay, presidential candidate
 Jon Siebels, guitarist for the band Eve 6

See also 
 List of political parties in the United States
 American Left
 ANSWER Coalition

Notes

References

External links 

 
 Answer Coalition.org
 Liberation News
 Liberation School

 
2004 establishments in California
Communist parties in the United States
Non-interventionist parties
Political parties established in 2004
Political parties in the United States
Socialist parties in the United States